Francis Kelly  was an Irish prelate of the Roman Catholic Church in the 19th century.

Kelly was born in Drudgeon, County Tyrone on 6 August 1812 He was educated at St Patrick's College, Maynooth and ordained  on 13 June 1840. After curacies in Strabane and Culdaff he was parish priest at Upper Fahan. He served as Coadjutor Bishop of Derry from 1849 until 1864, and then Diocesan Bishop of Derry until his death on 1 September 1889.

References

1889 deaths
18th-century Roman Catholic bishops in Ireland
Roman Catholic bishops of Derry
1812 births